Gary E. Sherman is an American judge and former legislator from Wisconsin.  Sherman served in the Wisconsin State Assembly from 1998–2010. He served as a Judge on the Wisconsin Court of Appeals from 2010–2019.

Born in Chicago, Illinois, Sherman received his bachelors and law degrees from University of Wisconsin–Madison, and lives in Port Wing, Wisconsin. He was appointed to the Wisconsin Court of Appeals, succeeding Judge Burnie Bridge, who retired in 2010. In May 2010, Sherman resigned from the Wisconsin Assembly and was sworn in as judge of the Wisconsin State Court of Appeals. Sherman retired on July 4, 2019.

References

External links
Judge Gary Sherman-Wisconsin Court of Appeals
 
 Follow the Money - Gary Sherman
2008 2006 2004 2002 2000 1998 campaign contributions
Campaign 2008 campaign contributions at Wisconsin Democracy Campaign

Politicians from Chicago
People from Bayfield County, Wisconsin
University of Wisconsin–Madison alumni
Wisconsin Court of Appeals judges
1949 births
Living people
Lawyers from Chicago
21st-century American politicians
Democratic Party members of the Wisconsin State Assembly